CDO may refer to:

Aeronautics 
 pronunciation of the zero-lift drag coefficient „”

Chemistry 
 Cysteine dioxygenase, an enzyme
 CDO, trade name of chlordiazepoxide
 CdO, cadmium oxide

Computing 
 Climate Data Operators, a command line suite for manipulating and analyzing climate data
 Collaboration Data Objects, a Microsoft application programming interface for data access
 Connected Data Objects, a free implementation of a distributed shared model

Places 
 Cagayan de Oro, a city on Mindanao Island, Philippines
 Canyon del Oro High School, a public school in Oro Valley, Arizona, USA
 Cañada del Oro, a primary watershed channel in the valley of Tucson, Arizona, USA

People

Job titles 
 Chief data officer, an information systems title
 Chief Dental Officer (Canada), a Canadian official who advises on oral health
 Chief Dental Officer (United Kingdom), a professional advisor for dentistry in each of the 4 UK governments
 Chief design officer, a corporate design position
 Chief development officer (aka Chief business development officer), a business position
 Chief Development Officer (India), a civil servant in the Indian states of Uttar Pradesh and Uttarakhand
 Chief digital officer
 Chief diversity officer
 Command duty officer

Other uses 
 CDO Foodsphere, a Philippine meat processing company
 Central dense overcast, in a tropical storm
 Collateralized debt obligation, a structured finance product
 Community dial office, a telephone switching system for small communities
 Continuous duty overnight, a regional airline crew scheduling term
 ISO-639 code for the Eastern Min branch of Chinese

See also

 
 Chief Dental Officer (disambiguation)